The Lost Lover, is a 1999 Italian-British drama film directed by Roberto Faenza.

Cast 

 Ciarán Hinds : Adam
 Juliet Aubrey : Asya
 Stuart Bunce : Gabriel
 Clara Bryant : Dafi
 Erick Vazquez : Na'im
 Juliet Aubrey: Asya
 Cyrus Elias : Herlich
 Edoardo Moscone : Yigal
 Phyllida Law :  The grandmother 
 Ahamed Abu Salun : Naim's father
 Abed Zuabi : Hamid
 Ariel Horowitz : Rabbi

References

External links

1999 films
1999 drama films
Films directed by Roberto Faenza
English-language Italian films
1990s English-language films
1990s Italian films
English-language drama films